Nikita Vladimirovich Mokin (born March 14, 1992) is a Kazakhstani-Russian professional ice hockey defenceman who is currently playing with Avangard Omsk in the Kontinental Hockey League (KHL). Mokin selected 148th overall in the seventh round of 2010 KHL Junior Draft by Avangard Omsk.

References

External links 

1992 births
Avangard Omsk players
Kazakhstani ice hockey players
Living people
Omskie Yastreby players
Sportspeople from Oskemen
Russian ice hockey defencemen